This is a list of comic strips printed within the pages of Eagle, a seminal British children's comic first published from 1950 to 1969, and then in a relaunched format from 1982 to 1994.

1950–1969

Adventure

"The Beast of Loch Craggon", illustrated by John McLusky (1962–64)
"Blackbow the Cheyenne", written by Ted Cowan and illustrated by Victor de la Fuente, Don Lawrence
"Can You Catch a Crook?'" illustrated by Victor de la Fuente, Paul Trevillion
"Dan Dare", by Frank Hampson and others, 1950–1969
"Danger Unlimited", illustrated by Martin Aitchison, 1962–63
"The Devil's Henchmen", illustrated by 
"For Bravery", written by Geoffrey Bond and illustrated by Cyril Holloway
"Fraser of Africa", written by George Beardmore and illustrated by Frank Bellamy
"The Guinea Pig", written by Willie Patterson, Tom Tully, David Motton, Bob Bartholomew, Frederick Smith, Alfred Wallace, illustrated by Colin Andrew, Gerald Haylock, Brian Lewis
"Heros the Spartan", written by Tom Tully, illustrated by Frank Bellamy, Luis Bermejo
"Home of the Wanderers", illustrated by Brian Lewis
"The Iron Man", illustrated by Gerry Embleton, Martin Salvador
"Jack O'Lantern", written by George Beardmore and illustrated by Robert Ayton and Cecil Langley Doughty, 1955–1959
"Johnny Frog", illustrated by Ron Embleton
"Knights of the Road", written by J. H. G. Freeman and illustrated by Gerald Haylock, 1960–62
"Luck of the Legion", written by Geoffrey Bond and illustrated by Martin Aitchison, 1952–1961
"Mann of Battle", illustrated by Brian Lewis
”Mark Question (The Boy with a future- but no past!)" Story by Alan Stranks, Drawn by Harry Lindfield First appeared in Eagle March 22, 1957  See also The Best of Eagle edited by Marcus Morris 1977 pages 121 to 128
"Marvel of MI5", written by David Cameron and illustrated by Paddy Nevin
"P.C. 49", written by Alan Stranks and illustrated by John Worsley
"Riders of the Range (comic strip)", written by Charles Chilton and illustrated by Jack Daniel, Angus Scott, Giorgio Bellavitis, Brian Lewis, Ferdinando Tacconi 1950–62
"Sky Buccaneers", illustrated by José Ortiz
"Smokeman", written by Ted Cowan and illustrated by José Ortiz
"Storm Nelson", illustrated by Richard Jennings and Giorgio Bellavitis
"Tommy Walls", illustrated by Frank Hampson, Harold Johns, John Worsley, Richard Jennings
"UFO Agent", written by Ted Cowan and illustrated by Paul Trevillion, José Ortiz
"What's His Name?", illustrated by Dudley Pout

Humour
"Blunderbirds"
"Captain Pugwash" by John Ryan, 1950–51
"Chicko", illustrated by Norman Thelwell
"Cornelius Dimworthy"
"Dimworthy and Co"
"Harris Tweed" by John Ryan, 1950–62
"Professor Puff and his dog Wuff"
"Waldorf & Cecil"

Literary adaptations
"The Lost World (Conan Doyle novel)", illustrated by Martin Aitchison
"[Condensed adaptation of C.S. Forester's trilogy of 'Happy Return' (1937),'Ship of the Line' (1938) & 'Flying Colours'(also 1938), which were 6th, 7th & 8th in the Hornblower saga according to chronological sequence]", illustrated by Martin Aitchison

Biography
"Alfred the Great", illustrated by Norman Williams
"The Baden-Powell Story", written by Geoffrey Bond (as Alan Jason) and illustrated by Norman Williams, 1954
"The Golden Man" (Sir Walter Raleigh), written by Marcus Morris and Guy Daniel and illustrated by Robert Ayton, 1961
"The Great Sailor" (Lord Nelson), illustrated by Norman Williams and Robert Ayton, 1957
"The Happy Warrior" (Winston Churchill), written by Clifford Makins and illustrated by Frank Bellamy
"Lincoln of America", written by Geoffrey Bond (as Alan Jason) and illustrated by Norman Williams, 1955
"Montgomery of Alamein", written by Clifford Makins and  illustrated by Frank Bellamy
"The Travels of Marco Polo", written by Chad Varah and illustrated by Frank Bellamy
"The True Story of St. Vincent de Paul", written by R. B. Saxe and illustrated by Norman Williams

Bible stories
"The Great Adventurer" (St. Paul), written by Chad Varah and illustrated by Frank Hampson and Norman Williams
"Mark, The Youngest Disciple" written by Chad Varah and illustrated by Giorgio Bellavitis
"The Road of Courage" (the life of Christ), written by Marcus Morris and Guy Daniel and illustrated by Frank Hampson and Joan Porter
"The Shepherd King" (King David), written by Clifford Makins and illustrated by Frank Bellamy

Reprints
The Adventures of Tintin from the Belgian Hergé (only ran King Ottokar's Sceptre, 1951-1952). Reprint but first appearance of Tintin in English.

1982–1994

Photo strips
The Collector – one-off morality tales based around items owned by The Collector
Doomlord – Eagle's most popular strip, a saga about a shape-changing alien sentencing humanity to death, but being replaced by another alien who served as Earth's protector. It later featured drawn artwork.
Fred – another half-page cartoon featuring a Charlie Chaplin-type character
The Invisible Boy – about a schoolboy who could become invisible
Joe Soap – a comedy strip about an incompetent private detective
Manix – an action strip about a robot secret agent. Later drawn.
Saddle Tramp – a western strip featuring a bounty hunter
Sgt. Streetwise – an undercover sergeant who used disguise to catch criminals
Thunderbolt and Smokey! – about two schoolboys creating their own football team
Walk or Die – a survival story about children in a plane crash in the Canadian wilderness

Hand-drawn strips

The Amstor Computer – a "story of the week" strip where readers sent in codes that loaded that week's story
Avenger – a vigilante with a day job as a teacher
Bloodfang – initially a naturalistic tale relating the life of a Tyrannosaur, who was later captured by time-travelling bounty hunters and shipped to a zoo in the 22nd century
The Brothers – the tale of twins, one regressed to a "caveman" state due to an industrial accident, trying to locate their family
Computer Warrior, initially known as Ultimate Warrior – a popular and long-lived strip featuring a boy who could play computer games for real using a "real life code"
Comrade Bronski – yet another incarnation of the 'hard man' formula, this time with the central character as a member of the KGB rooting out internal corruption
Crowe St. Comp – the adventures of a group of comprehensive schoolchildren
D.A.D.D. – Dial A Dawn Destructor, a group of rock stars, Dawn Destruction, who solved crimes during the night
Dan Dare, initially illustrated by Gerry Embleton, then Ian Kennedy after a brief stint by Oli Frey – notable for being a drawn strip, in lavish colour
Detective Zed – a humorous strip about a robot detective in 22nd-century London
Dolebusters – a strip about three young would-be entrepreneurs who will do anything for ready cash
Ernie – a short (usually three panels) comedy cartoon featuring a hapless eagle, Eagle'''s mascot
The Fifth Horseman – a drawn strip, initially about the Four Horsemen of the Apocalypse, becoming a story about an alien computer attempting world domination
The Fists of Danny Pike – about an amateur boxer overcoming adversity to become world champion
Ghost Squad – a spin-off of Death Wish (below), about a squad of ghost detectives
Ghostworld
Gil Hazzard (Scorpio) – a drawn strip about a 'hard man', with the gimmick of its initial run in Stereoscopic 3D
The Hard Men (comic strip), also known as Clovis and Chowdhary'' – generic 'hard men' strip about two MI5 agents blackmailed into performing secret missions
The Hand – about a freelance photographer who loses a hand in an accident. When his hand is replaced by dead gangster's, it starts to control him
The House of Correction – set in a Nazi concentration camp
Jake's Platoon – set in World War II
The House of Daemon – a strip involving characters trying to escape a haunted house
Kid Cops – a science fiction strip where, as all future wars are fought on the Moon, Earth is largely deserted and children must become the police
Legend of the Linkits – a toy merchandising tie-in, about a war of robots built from building blocks similar to Meccano or Lego
Manta Force – a toy merchandising tie-in, about a group of space colonists who end up in a civil war on their new home. The strip was notable for the colony ship/toy appearing roughly the size of a supermarket yet supposedly containing thousands of troops, tanks and equipment stowed away for the duration of its voyage
M.A.S.K. – a toy merchandising tie-in, about the members of MASK fighting their arch-enemies VENOM with the aid of hi-tech masks and transforming combat vehicles
News Team – a group of investigative reporters undertaking adventures in war-torn countries and similarly dangerous locations
Roadblasters – a toy merchandising tie-in, about organised racing across an entire planet
Robo Machines – a toy merchandising tie-in, about the battle of good and evil by sentient shapeshifting robots, similar to Transformers, but based on Bandai's British version of Gobots.
Shadow (comic strip) – a strip about a wandering police dog, similar to Lassie but with more violence
Soup Squad – a secret division of Scotland Yard dedicated to investigating supernatural crimes
S.O.S. – a strip from the back catalogue of Battle about a group of crack undercover soldiers, continued with new material
Survival – a science fiction strip about a group of children struggling to survive in a world where every adult has died of plague. The strip is remarkably similar to Kids Rule O.K., which got its parent comic Action banned due to its continual and senseless violence
Timespell
The Tower King – set in a modern-day London reduced to medieval anarchy
Toys of Doom – a sequel of a frequently reprinted multi-part horror strip originally seen in Buster in 1966, involving toys that could be controlled similarly to General Jumbo

Reprinted from 2000 AD
Ant Wars – an action strip involving battle with enormously mutated South American ants
M.A.C.H. 1 – an action strip about a British super-agent
M.A.C.H. Zero – a prequel to M.A.C.H.1

Absorbed from Scream!
The Thirteenth Floor
The Monster

Absorbed from Tiger
Billy's Boots – about a boy footballer who owned the boots of the legendary Dead-Shot Keen, which made him an unbeatable player
Death Wish – about disfigured race driver Blake Edmonds, who undertook extremely dangerous adventures and stunts as he felt he had nothing to lose
Golden Boy – an extremely gifted athlete who grew up in a feral state on isolated moorland
Star Rider – an alien who stayed on Earth to compete in BMX championships

Absorbed from Battle
Charley's War – a critically acclaimed, and meticulously researched, fictionalised account of World War I
Johnny Red – a World War II British fighter pilot who fights alongside the Russian army
Storm Force – a non-stop action strip about a squad of elite anti-terrorist warriors, inspired by Action Force
Gaunt – set in World War II, about an unbalanced "hard man" given a superhumanly strong artificial hand to replace one lost during torture
One-Eyed Jack – yet another "hard man" cop, wearing an eyepatch. The series, set in New York, was created by John Wagner and provided inspiration for Wagner's Judge Dredd.

Absorbed from Wildcat
Joe Alien
Kitten Magee
Loner
Turbo Jones

1990 relaunch
A rebooted Dan Dare, attempting to return to the thematic roots of the character
Beast! – a short-lived horror strip about a demonic creature terrorising a fairground
The Eagle One-off – another 'story of the week' strip
Dark Angels – a mature strip about teenaged skateboarding vigilantes
Mask of Evil – another short-lived strip about a mask that forced its wearer to commit immoral acts
Mowser
My Pet Alien
Rat Trap – a strip about a serial burglar, Dr. Ratty Rat (though exactly what he was a doctor of was never revealed), who looked like a rat, with a powerful sonic rasp. Readers would send in extravagant plans to trap him (e.g. "feed him enough chocolate so he can't move so you can arrest him"), which would be executed by B.I.F.F.F. (British Institute For Foiling Felonies) but always failed (e.g. he would use his rasp to blow open the doors of the police van and escape).

References

 
Eagle